Wat Phra Singh (full name: Wat Phra Singh Woramahaviharn; ; ; (pronunciation)) is a Buddhist temple (Thai language: Wat) in Chiang Mai, northern Thailand.
King Ananda Mahidol (Rama VIII), bestowed upon it the status of Royal temple of the first grade in 1935.

Location 
Wat Phra Singh is located in the western part of the old city centre of Chiang Mai, which is contained within the city walls and moat.
The main entrance is guarded by Singhs (lions). Wat Pra Singh is situated at the end of the main street (Rachadamnoen road) of Chiang Mai. The road runs east from the temple, via Tapae Gate, to the Ping River.

Name 

Phra Singh is an abbreviated form of Phra-Put-Tha-Shi-Hing and does not refer to the word Singh ("lion").

Notability 

The temple houses an important Buddha statue: the Phra Buddha Sihing which gives the temple its name.
The origins of this statue are unknown but, according to legend, it was based on the lion of Shakya, a statue since lost which used to be housed in the Mahabodhi Temple of Bodh Gaya (India). The Phra Buddha Sihing statue is supposed to have been brought, via Ceylon (present day Sri Lanka), to Ligor (present day Nakhon Si Thammarat) and, from there, via Ayutthaya, to Chiang Mai.

There are two more Buddha statues in Thailand which are claimed to be the Phra Buddha Sihing: one is housed in Wat Phra Mahathat in the city of Nakhon Si Thammarat and another one the Bangkok National Museum.

It is alleged that the head of the statue had been stolen in 1922. The possibility remains that the present statue (or maybe only the head) is a copy.

Every year, during the Songkran festival, the statue is taken from wihan Lai Kham and carried through the streets of Chiang Mai in a religious procession during which the spectators honour the statue by sprinkling water over it.

History 

Construction on Wat Phra Singh began in 1345 when King Phayu, the fifth king of the Mangrai dynasty, had a chedi built to house the ashes of his father King Kham Fu. A wihan and several other buildings were added a few years later and the resulting complex was named Wat Lichiang Phra. When, in 1367, the statue of Phra Buddha Singh was brought to the temple, the temple complex received its present name. During restoration works in 1925, three funerary urns were discovered inside a small chedi. It was assumed that these contained royal ashes. The urns have since been lost.

From 1578 to 1774 the Burmese ruled Lanna and in this period the temple was abandoned and came under serious disrepair. It was only when King Kawila assumed the throne as King of Chiang Mai in 1782, that the temple was restored. King Kawila had the ubosot built and the chedi enlarged. Later successors restored the Wihan Lai Kham and the elegant Ho Trai (temple library).

The whole temple complex underwent extensive renovations under the famous monk Khru Ba Srivichai during the 1920s. Many of the buildings were again restored in 2002.

Sights 

 Wihan Luang – the original wihan was replaced by the present building in 1925.
 Wihan Lai Kham – this wihan is the main attraction of the complex. It was built in 1345 to house the Phra Buddha Singh statue and it is a prime example of classical Lanna architecture. The murals of the wihan are also highly remarkable. The murals on the left show the history of Songthong and on the right the history of Suwanna Hongse.
 Ubosot – built in 1806, it contains two entrances: a south entrance for monks and a north entrance for nuns. It is as such a song sangha ubosot ('song' meaning 'two' in Thai). The building houses a mondop with the Phrachaotongtip Buddha statue, a smaller version of the Phra Buddha Sihing and it is therefore also known as Phrasingha noi ('noi' meaning 'small' in Thai). The northern end of the wihan, near the entrance for the nuns, contains a copy of the Emerald Buddha.
 Ho Trai – the temple library is another prime example of classical Lanna architecture and it is one of the most beautiful temple libraries in Thailand. The guards, flanking the stairs, consist of lions emerging from the mouths of a Makara, a mythical water creature. This combination is rarely seen elsewhere.
 The Phrathatluang – each side of the square base of the main chedi of the complex features the front half of an elephant emerging from it. After it was built in 1345, the chedi was enlarged several times. 
 The Kulai chedi – this small square based chedi, built as a pagoda with five tiered roofs by King Mueangkaeo (1495–1525), is connected to Wihan Lai Kham by a short tunnel which is not opened to visitors. When the chedi was restored under King Dharmalanka (1813–1822), a golden box containing ancient relics was found. After the works were completed, the box and its contents were placed once more inside the chedi.

Wat Phra Singh UK 
In 2013, a Wat was established in Runcorn in Cheshire, England with the support of Wat Phra Singh and the President of the Council for Thai Buddhist Monks in the UK. The former Waterloo Hotel was converted into a Buddhist temple by Wat Phra Singh UK. , there are five resident monks.

Gallery

See also 
 Thai temple art and architecture
 Phra Phuttha Sihing, for the image now in Bangkok

References 

 Michael Freeman, Donald Stadtner, Claude Jacques: Lanna – Thailand's Northern Kingdom. River Books, Bangkok 2001,  
 Clarence Aasen: Architecture of Siam. Oxford University Press 1998, 
 Carol Stratton: Buddhist Sculpture of Northern Thailand. Silkworm Books, Chiang Mai 2004, 
 'Wat Phra Singh Woramahaviharn', in: Forbes, Andrew, and Henley, David, Ancient Chiang Mai Volume 4. Chiang Mai, Cognoscenti Books, 2012. 
 Oliver Hargreave: Exploring Chiang Mai, City, Valley & Mountains. Within Books, 3rd print, 2002. 

Phra Singh
Thai Theravada Buddhist temples and monasteries
14th-century Buddhist temples